Mountain Lake is a lake in Cook County, Minnesota, in the United States.

Mountain Lake lies between Moose Mountain and Mount Reunion, hence the name.

See also
List of lakes in Minnesota

References

Lakes of Minnesota
Lakes of Cook County, Minnesota